The 1963 Australian GT Championship was a CAMS sanctioned Australian motor racing title for GT cars complying with Appendix K regulations.
The championship was contested over a single 10 lap race staged at the Calder Motor Raceway in Victoria, Australia on 8 December 1963. 
It was the fourth annual Australian GT Championship.

The championship was won by Bob Jane driving a Jaguar E-Type lightweight.

Results

Note: The finishers included "Sundry Austin A30s".

Race statistics
 Race distance:10 laps (reduced from the original 20 laps)
 Starters: 9
 Race time of winning car: 8:48.8
 Winning margin: 10.6 seconds
 Fastest lap: Bob Jane (Jaguar E-Type lightweight), 51.8 seconds (new GT lap record)

References

Australian GT Championship
GT Championship